Kalevi Nupponen (born 19 January 1942) is a Finnish footballer. He played in four matches for the Finland national football team from 1961 to 1970.

References

1942 births
Living people
Finnish footballers
Finland international footballers
Place of birth missing (living people)
Association footballers not categorized by position